İbradı is a district situated in the Antalya Province of Turkey.

İbradı is a high plain in the Taurus Mountains. In summer the weather is dry and cooler than the nearby Mediterranean coast with a daytime temperature of 30 degrees C and 10 degrees C at night. The mountains are covered with forests of juniper, cedar and pine, watered by mountain streams that eventually form the Manavgat River. The people of İbradı mainly live from grazing goats on the hillsides and from forestry; there is no commercial farming although people have gardens, vineyards and fruit trees.

History
This area was once part of the antique kingdom of Pisidia, near the river Melas. It is unclear however when the district was first settled. 

In the Turkish period the area was an important passage over the Taurus Mountains for traders from the Mediterranean, and was used as a summer retreat from the heat on the coast. There are the foundations of a Seljuk Turkish caravanserai in the district of Kesikbel. 

People who live in Ibradi districts today are mainly Teke Turkmens. Same root with today's Teke Turkmens from Turkmenistan. They are member of Oghuz Salur Tribe.

Places of interest
 The cave of Düdensuyu  - not yet open to the public
 A number of Hellenistic and Ancient Roman sites, including the ruins of the city of Erymna (Ormana)
 Some historic houses in the town of Ormana. 
There are of course many places for climbing and mountain walking.

References

External links
 Ibradi municipality

Yaylas in Turkey
Districts of Antalya Province
Populated places in Antalya Province